Fred James Douglas (September 14, 1869 – January 1, 1949) was a United States representative from New York. Born in Clinton, Worcester County, Massachusetts, he moved with his parents to Little Falls, New York in 1874. He attended the public schools and was graduated from the medical department of Dartmouth College in 1895. He moved to Utica the same year and commenced the practice of medicine. He was a member of the board of education of Utica from 1910 to 1920 and was Mayor of Utica from 1922 to 1924. In 1928 and 1929 he was commissioner of public safety of Utica, and in 1934, he was an unsuccessful candidate for Lieutenant Governor of New York.

Douglas was elected as a Republican to the 75th and to the three succeeding Congresses, holding office from January 3, 1937 to January 3, 1945. He was an unsuccessful candidate for renomination in 1944 and resumed his former profession as a surgeon. In 1949, he died in Utica; interment was in Mount Olivet Cemetery, Whitesboro.

References 

1869 births
1949 deaths
Dartmouth College alumni
Physicians from New York (state)
School board members in New York (state)
Mayors of Utica, New York
People from Clinton, Massachusetts
Republican Party members of the United States House of Representatives from New York (state)
American surgeons